John Nightingale (born December 2, 1928) is an American former figure skater. He was born in Saint Paul, Minnesota. He competed in pairs with partner Janet Gerhauser, twice winning the silver medal at the United States Figure Skating Championships and taking part in the 1952 Winter Olympic Games. He also competed in fours with Gerhauser, Marilyn Thomsen, and Marlyn Thomsen and won the 1949 North American title.

Competitive highlights

Results
(with Gerhauser)

Fours
(with Gerhauser, Thomsen, and Thomsen)

References
John Nightingale's profile at Sports Reference.com

1928 births
Living people
American male pair skaters
Olympic figure skaters of the United States
Figure skaters at the 1952 Winter Olympics
20th-century American people